In linguistics, an alternation is the phenomenon of a morpheme exhibiting variation in its phonological realization. Each of the various realizations is called an alternant. The variation may be conditioned by the phonological, morphological, and/or syntactic environment in which the morpheme finds itself.

Alternations provide linguists with data that allow them to determine the allophones and allomorphs of a language's phonemes and morphemes and to develop analyses determining the distribution of those allophones and allomorphs.

Phonologically conditioned alternation

An example of a phonologically conditioned alternation is the English plural marker commonly spelled s or es.

 If the preceding sound is a sibilant consonant (one of ), or an affricate (one of ), the plural marker takes the form . Examples:
mass , plural masses 
fez , plural fezzes 
mesh , plural meshes 
mirage , plural mirages 
church , plural churches 
bridge , plural bridges 
 Otherwise, if the preceding sound is voiceless, the plural marker takes the likewise voiceless form . Examples:
mop , plural mops 
mat , plural mats 
pack , plural packs 
cough , plural coughs 
myth , plural myths 
 Otherwise, the preceding sound is voiced, and the plural marker takes the likewise voiced form .
dog , plural dogs 
glove , plural gloves 
ram , plural rams 
doll , plural dolls 
toe , plural toes

Alternation related to meaning

Morphologically conditioned alternation
French has an example of morphologically conditioned alternation. The feminine form of many adjectives ends in a consonant sound that is missing in the masculine form. In spelling, the feminine ends in a silent e, while the masculine ends in a silent consonant letter:
masculine petit , feminine petite  "small"
masculine grand , feminine grande  "tall"
masculine gros , feminine grosse  "big"
masculine joyeux , feminine joyeuse  "merry"
masculine franc , feminine franche  "sincere"
masculine bon , feminine bonne  "good"

Syntactically conditioned alternation
Syntactically conditioned alternations can be found in the Insular Celtic languages, where words undergo various initial consonant mutations depending on their syntactic position. For example, in Irish, an adjective undergoes lenition after a feminine singular noun:
unmutated mór  "big", mutated in bean mhór  "a big woman"
In Welsh, a noun undergoes soft mutation when it is the direct object of a finite verb:
unmutated beic  "bike", mutated in Prynodd y ddynes feic  "The woman bought a bike"

See also
 Apophony
 Sandhi
 Allophone

Notes

References

Linguistic morphology
Phonology